Anthony Rendon (born March 4, 1968) is an American politician serving as the 70th and current Speaker of the California State Assembly since 2016. A member of the Democratic Party, he is the fifth-longest-serving speaker in California history (and the longest-serving speaker to serve his first term after the adoption of California's term limits).  Since 2022, he has represented the 62nd district, located in the southeastern part of Los Angeles County, including the cities of South Gate, Lynwood, and Paramount. He previously represented the 63rd district from 2012 to 2022.

Early life and career 
Rendon was born on March 4, 1968 in Silver Lake, a neighborhood in central Los Angeles. His grandparents immigrated from Mexico to the United States during the 1920s. He grew up in a working class family that frequently moved around the Los Angeles area. His father, Tom Rendon, worked multiple jobs, including for a mobile home company, and his mother, Gloria Rendon, was a teacher's aide at a Catholic school.

Rendon attended California High School, Whittier, graduating in 1986. He has stated that he was a "terrible student." At the age of 20, he enrolled in and attended Cerritos College, a community college in Norwalk, California, before earning a bachelor's degree and master's degree from California State University, Fullerton. After receiving a National Endowment for the Humanities fellowship, Rendon earned his Ph.D. in political science from the University of California, Riverside, graduating in 2000. He completed post-doctoral work at Boston University.

Prior to becoming a member of the California State Assembly, Rendon was the executive director of Plaza de la Raza Child Development Services, an organization that provides child development and social and medical services throughout Los Angeles County. He was also the interim executive director of the California League of Conservation Voters, a lobbying organization dedicated to environmental issues. He worked with the Mexican American Opportunity Foundation in early childhood education efforts. From 2001 to 2008, he was an adjunct professor in the Department of Political Science and Criminal Justice at California State University, Fullerton.

Political career 
During his first term in office, Rendon was chair of the Assembly Committee on Water, Parks, and Wildlife and authored Proposition 1, the $7.5 billion state water bond, which voters approved in the November 2014 election.

In 2013, Rendon authored Assembly Bill 711, a statewide ban on lead hunting ammunition, that was signed into law.

In 2015, Rendon was named chair of the Assembly Committee on Utilities and Commerce.

On September 3, 2015, Rendon was selected to be the next Assembly Speaker.  The formal vote electing Rendon as Speaker occurred on January 11.  The vote was unanimous, with the Republican leader seconding the motion.

Rendon brought back the tradition of past California Assembly Speakers of carrying no legislation himself, but focusing on empowering the members of the chamber.  Despite this, he has made certain priorities of his known, including wildfire planning, and continuing to address poverty and educational deficits in California.

On February 19, 2021, The Sacramento Bee reported that nonprofit organizations associated with Rendon's wife, Annie Lam, had received over $500,000 in donations and event sponsorships from over a dozen companies that had business interests at stake with the legislature.

On Thursday, November 10, the California Democratic Caucus voted for Assemblymember Robert Rivas to be the next Speaker of the California State Assembly. Assemblymember Anthony Rendon will remain as Speaker until June 2023.

Career

2012 California State Assembly

2014 California State Assembly

2016 California State Assembly

2018 California State Assembly

2020 California State Assembly

Personal life 

Rendon resides in Lakewood, California. In December 2014, Rendon married Annie Lam in a ceremony officiated by former California State Assembly Speaker John A. Pérez.

References

External links 
 
 Join California Anthony Rendon

1968 births
21st-century American politicians
Mexican-American people in California politics
California State University, Fullerton alumni
California State University, Fullerton faculty
Cerritos College alumni
Hispanic and Latino American state legislators in California
Living people
People from Lakewood, California
Politicians from Los Angeles
Speakers of the California State Assembly
Democratic Party members of the California State Assembly
University of California, Riverside alumni
People from Whittier, California